Shivam Sharma (born 9 September 1993) is a cricketer who plays for Kings XI Punjab. Sharma is an all-rounder who bats right-handed and bowls off break. In 2012, he captained the Delhi Under-19 and North Zone Under-19 cricket teams.

In 2014, he was signed up by Kings XI Punjab for INR 1 million, without having played any form of senior cricket. He made his senior cricket debut in the 2014 IPL for Kings XI Punjab against Royal Challengers Bangalore on 9 May 2014, and scored 4 runs and had bowling figures of 2/26 in 4 overs having dismissed Yuvraj Singh and Albie Morkel.

References

External links
 

Indian cricketers
Living people
1993 births
Punjab Kings cricketers
Delhi cricketers